The 2017 Caribbean Club Championship was the 19th edition of the Caribbean Club Championship (also known as the CFU Club Championship), the annual international club football competition in the Caribbean region, held amongst clubs whose football associations are affiliated with the Caribbean Football Union (CFU), a sub-confederation of CONCACAF.

The top four teams qualified for next season's CONCACAF club competitions, an increase from the previous three following the expansion of the CONCACAF club competition platform. The champions qualified for the CONCACAF Champions League tournament proper, while the second through fourth place teams qualified for the new Champions League qualifying tournament, the CONCACAF League.

Cibao won the tournament by defeating San Juan Jabloteh in the final, becoming the first team from the Dominican Republic to be crowned Caribbean club champions and the first to qualify for the CONCACAF Champions League. Runners-up San Juan Jabloteh, together with third place Portmore United and fourth place Central, who were the two-time defending champions, qualified for the first edition of the CONCACAF League.

Teams

The tournament was open to all league champions and runners-up from each of the 31 CFU member associations, once their competition ended by the end of 2016.

A total of 21 teams from 12 CFU associations entered the competition. This is the first CFU Club Championship to feature a team from Sint Maarten, and the first since 2004 to feature a team from Montserrat.

The defending champions Central received a bye to the final round (to make room in the first round for Puerto Rico FC, who were left out of the original draw), while the other 20 teams entered the first round.

Notes

Associations which did not enter a team

 Anguilla
 Aruba
 Bahamas
 Barbados
 Bermuda
 Bonaire
 British Virgin Islands
 Cuba
 Curaçao
 Dominica
 French Guiana
 Grenada
 Guyana
 Martinique
 Saint Kitts and Nevis
 Saint Lucia
 Saint-Martin
 Turks and Caicos Islands
 U.S. Virgin Islands

Schedule
The original groups and schedule were announced by CFU and CONCACAF on 16 January 2017, with the revised groups and schedule after the admission of Puerto Rico FC announced on 26 January 2017.

First round
In the first round, the 20 teams were divided into five groups of four teams. Each group was played on a round-robin basis, hosted by one of the teams at a centralized venue. The winners of each group advanced to the final round to join the defending champions Central.

Group A
Host venue: Antigua Recreation Ground, St. John's, Antigua and Barbuda (all times UTC−4)

Group B
Host venue: Stade Sylvio Cator, Port-au-Prince, Haiti (all times UTC−5)

Group C
Host venue: Montego Bay Sports Complex, Montego Bay, Jamaica (all times UTC−5)

Group D
Host venue: Estadio Juan Ramón Loubriel, Bayamón, Puerto Rico (all times UTC−4)

Group E
Host venue: Victoria Park, Kingstown, Saint Vincent and the Grenadines (all times UTC−4)

Final round
In the final round, the six teams (the defending champions Central, which received a bye to the final round, and the five group winners from the first round) were drawn into two groups of three teams (initially the final round was to be played in one group). Each group was played on a round-robin basis. The winners of each group advanced to the final, while the runners-up advanced to the third place match.

The draw of the final round was held on 29 March 2017. Central, as the hosts of the final round, and San Juan Jabloteh, as the best performing team in the first round, were seeded into Groups A and B respectively.

The champions qualified for the 2018 CONCACAF Champions League, while the teams finishing second through fourth qualified for the 2017 CONCACAF League.

Host venue: Hasely Crawford Stadium, Port of Spain, Trinidad and Tobago (all times UTC−4)

Group A

Group B

Third place match

Final
Winners qualified for 2018 CONCACAF Champions League. Runners-up qualified for 2017 CONCACAF League.

Top goalscorers

See also
2017 CONCACAF League
2018 CONCACAF Champions League

References

External links
CFU Club Championship, CFUfootball.org

2017
1
2017 CONCACAF League
2018 CONCACAF Champions League